Desmond Thomas Doss (February 7, 1919 – March 23, 2006) was a United States Army corporal who served as a combat medic with an infantry company in World War II.

He was twice awarded the Bronze Star Medal for actions on Guam and in the Philippines. Doss further distinguished himself in the Battle of Okinawa by saving 75 men, becoming the only conscientious objector to receive the Medal of Honor for his actions during the war.

His life has been the subject of books, the 2004 documentary The Conscientious Objector, and the 2016 Oscar nominated film Hacksaw Ridge, where he was portrayed by Andrew Garfield.

Early life
Desmond Doss was born in Lynchburg, Virginia, to William Thomas Doss (1893–1989), a carpenter, and Bertha Edward Doss (née Oliver) (1899–1983), a homemaker and shoe factory worker. His mother raised him as a devout Seventh-day Adventist and instilled Sabbath-keeping, nonviolence, and a vegetarian lifestyle in his upbringing. He grew up in the Fairview Heights area of Lynchburg, Virginia, alongside his older sister Audrey and younger brother Harold.

Doss attended the Park Avenue Seventh-day Adventist Church school until the eighth grade, and subsequently found a job at the Lynchburg Lumber Company to support his family during the Great Depression.

World War II service

Before the outbreak of World War II, Doss was employed as a joiner at a shipyard in Newport News, Virginia. He chose military service, despite being offered a deferment because of his shipyard work, on April 1, 1942, at Camp Lee, Virginia. He was sent to Fort Jackson in South Carolina for training with the reactivated 77th Infantry Division.

Doss refused to kill an enemy soldier or carry a weapon into combat because of his personal beliefs as a Seventh-day Adventist. He consequently became a medic assigned to the 2nd Platoon, Company B, 1st Battalion, 307th Infantry, 77th Infantry Division.

While serving with his platoon in 1944 in Guam and the Philippines, he was awarded two Bronze Star Medals with a "V" device, for exceptional valor in aiding wounded soldiers under fire. During the Battle of Okinawa, he saved the lives of 50–100 wounded infantrymen atop the area known by the 96th Division as the Maeda Escarpment or Hacksaw Ridge. Doss suffered a left arm fracture from a sniper's bullet while being carried back to Allied lines and at one point had seventeen pieces of shrapnel embedded in his body after attempting to kick a grenade away from him and his men. He was awarded the Medal of Honor for his actions in Okinawa.

Post-war life 

After the war, Doss initially planned to continue his career in carpentry, but extensive damage to his left arm made him unable to do so. In 1946, Doss was diagnosed with tuberculosis, which he had contracted on Leyte. He underwent treatment for five and a half years – losing a lung and five ribs – before being discharged from the hospital in August 1951 with 90% disability.

Doss continued to receive treatment from the military, but after an overdose of antibiotics rendered him completely deaf in 1976, he was given 100% disability; he was able to regain his hearing after receiving a cochlear implant in 1988. Despite the severity of his injuries, Doss managed to raise a family on a small farm in Rising Fawn, Georgia.

Doss married Dorothy Pauline Schutte on August 17, 1942, and they had one child, Desmond "Tommy" Doss Jr., born in 1946. Dorothy died on November 17, 1991, in a car accident, while being driven to the hospital by Desmond. Doss remarried on July 1, 1993, to Frances May Duman.

After being hospitalized for difficulty breathing, Doss died on March 23, 2006, at his home in Piedmont, Alabama. He was buried on April 3, 2006, in the Chattanooga National Cemetery, Tennessee. Frances died three years later on February 3, 2009, at the Piedmont Health Care Center in Piedmont, Alabama.

Awards and decorations

Medal of Honor

Other awards and decorations

Other honors and recognition

 A portion of US Route 501 near Peaks View Park is named "Pfc. Desmond T. Doss Memorial Expressway." Local veterans of the area honor him by decorating the signs marking this portion of road several times during the year, particularly around patriotic holidays.
 In 1951, Camp Desmond T. Doss was created in Grand Ledge, Michigan to help train young Seventh-day Adventist men for service in the military. The camp was active throughout the Korean and Vietnam Wars before the property was sold in 1988.
 In the early 1980s, a school in Lynchburg was renamed Desmond T. Doss Christian Academy. The school was founded by the Lynchburg Seventh-day Adventist Church, the home church of Desmond Doss during his years in Lynchburg. The church wanted to honor Doss for standing strong in his faith despite facing great adversity. Doss visited the school that bears his name three times before his death.
 On July 10, 1990, a section of Georgia Highway 2 between US Highway 27 and Georgia Highway 193 in Walker County was named the "Desmond T. Doss Medal of Honor Highway."
 On March 20, 2000, Doss appeared before the Georgia House of Representatives and was presented a special resolution honoring his heroic accomplishments on behalf of the country.
 On July 4, 2004, a statue of Doss was dedicated at the National Museum of Patriotism in Atlanta, Georgia, which remained until the museum's closure in July 2010.
 In May 2007, a statue of Doss was dedicated at Veterans Memorial Park in Collegedale, Tennessee.
 In July 2008, the guest house at Walter Reed Army Medical Center in Washington, D.C., was renamed Doss Memorial Hall.
 On August 30, 2008, a two-mile stretch of Alabama Highway 9 in Piedmont was named the "Desmond T. Doss Sr. Memorial Highway."
 On October 25, 2016, the City of Lynchburg, Virginia, awarded a plaque in his honor to Desmond T. Doss Christian Academy.
 On February 7, 2017, PETA posthumously honored Doss with a Hero to Animals award in recognition of his lifelong commitment to vegetarianism.
 On May 7, 2019, the U.S. Army Health Clinic-Schofield Barracks in Hawaii was renamed the Desmond T. Doss Health Clinic in honor of him.
 On October 12, 2020, the Lynchburg Virginia Area Veterans Council dedicated a plaque at his former childhood home to commemorate the Desmond T. Doss Veterans Home. The home is Doss' birthplace and is now used as a homeless and displaced veterans shelter.

In media

Television and film
On February 18, 1959, Doss appeared on the Ralph Edwards NBC TV show This Is Your Life.

Doss is the subject of The Conscientious Objector, a 2004 documentary by Terry Benedict.

The 2016 feature film Hacksaw Ridge, based on his life, was produced by Terry Benedict and directed by Mel Gibson, with Andrew Garfield portraying him.

Doss was profiled in a three-part TV series by It Is Written in November 2016.

Print
Doss is the subject of four biographical books:
 
 Desmond Doss Conscientious Objector: The Story of an Unlikely Hero (2015) by Frances M. Doss
 Redemption at Hacksaw Ridge: The Gripping True Story That Inspired The Movie (2016) by Booton Herndon
 The Birth of Hacksaw Ridge: How It All Began (2017) by Gregory Crosby and Gene Church

See also

 Bull Allen (soldier)
 List of Medal of Honor recipients for World War II
 Medical Cadet Corps

Notes

References

Further reading
 
 
 
 Leepson, Marc (2008), "Wonder Man of Okinawa," Military History magazine, September/October 2008, Vol. 25, No. 4.
 “Doss, Desmond,” America's Heroes: Medal of Honor Recipients from the Civil War to Iraq, edited by James Willbanks. ABC-CLIO, 2011.

External links

 
 
 "Medal of Honor recipients World War II (A–F)". United States Army Center of Military History
 "Burial Set April 3 At National Cemetery For Medal of Honor Winner Desmond Doss". The Chattanoogan.
 Leepson, Marc (2015). "Desmond Thomas Doss (1919–2006)", Dictionary of Virginia Biography, Library of Virginia (1998–)
 
 
 
 
 
 

1919 births
2006 deaths
American Christian pacifists
American Seventh-day Adventists
Christian vegetarianism
Combat medics
Conscientious objector Medal of Honor recipients
Military personnel from Virginia
People from Lynchburg, Virginia
People from Piedmont, Alabama
People from the Anniston–Oxford metropolitan area
United States Army Medal of Honor recipients
United States Army non-commissioned officers
United States Army personnel of World War II
World War II recipients of the Medal of Honor